IM Motors (Chinese: 智己汽车, Zhiji Motors) is electric vehicle joint venture between Chinese automobile manufacturer SAIC Motor and Chinese technology companies Zhangjiang Hi-Tech and Alibaba Group.

Etymology
The company's English name IM stands for "Intelligence in Motion". Its Chinese name is Zhiji Motors (智己汽车).

History
The IM Motors joint venture between SAIC Motor, Alibaba Group, and Zhangjiang Hi-Tech was established in December 2020, and a 3D rendering of the company's upcoming sedan, aiming to compete with the Tesla Model S, was presented later in January 2021.

A dynamically developing industry in China, the so-called New Energy Vehicles are distinguished by their high-performance and high power drive systems.

In April 2021 at the Auto Shanghai auto show, IM Motors presented three vehicles; the L7 electric executive car prototype, along with two concepts, the LS7 mid-size SUV and the Airo designed by English designer Thomas Heatherwick.

Vehicles

Production models
IM Motors currently produces or will produce the following models:

 L7 (production from 2022), an executive car, first presented at Auto Shanghai as a prototype rivaling the Tesla Model S

 L5, an upcoming compact executive electric sedan positioned under the L7 and rivaling the Tesla Model 3.

 LS7, a mid-size SUV previewed by the LS7 concept.

Concept vehicles
IM Motors has revealed the following concept cars:

 Airo (2021, Shanghai), a 4-door concept car designed by Heatherwick Studio.
 LS7 (2021, Shanghai), a mid-size SUV concept previewing an upcoming model.

References

SAIC Motor
SAIC Motor joint ventures
Joint ventures
 
Vehicle manufacturing companies established in 2020
Electric vehicle manufacturers of China